Martina Hingis was the defending champion and successfully defended her title, by defeating Kim Clijsters 6–0, 6–3 in the final. She received a Porsche Boxster-S as a prize.

Seeds
The first four seeds received a bye into the second round.

Draw

Finals

Top half

Bottom half

References

External links
 Official results archive (ITF)
 Official results archive (WTA)

Porsche Tennis Grand Prix Singles
2000 Women's Singles